Olivier Baudry (born 13 April 1970) is a retired French football defender.

References

1970 births
Living people
French footballers
RC Lens players
Louhans-Cuiseaux FC players
R. Charleroi S.C. players
Royal Excel Mouscron players
FC Mulhouse players
K.R.C. Zuid-West-Vlaanderen players
FC Aarau players
R.A.E.C. Mons players
F91 Dudelange players
Racing FC Union Luxembourg players
SR Delémont players
Jeunesse Esch players
French expatriate footballers
Expatriate footballers in Belgium
French expatriate sportspeople in Belgium
Expatriate footballers in Luxembourg
French expatriate sportspeople in Luxembourg
Expatriate footballers in Switzerland
French expatriate sportspeople in Switzerland
Association football defenders